AQ Interactive, Inc. was a Japanese video game developer and publisher. AQ stands for Artistic Quality. It was the parent company of the developers Artoon, Cavia and feelplus, and most recently the U.S. publisher Xseed Games. AQ Interactive and its subsidiaries produced games both under the AQ Interactive name, as well as developing for other publishers such as Xbox Game Studios and Nintendo.

History 
AQ Interactive was founded on October 1, 2005, when Cavia, established on March 1, 2000, changed its name and became a holding company responsible for the management of subsidiary companies as well as sales and promotion of video game software. The old company's game planning & development business became Cavia Inc. which remained a subsidiary of AQI, until July 2010, when Cavia was re-absorbed as a part of AQI.

It published its first game in November 2005, the Xbox 360 launch title Tetris: The Grand Master ACE.

On March 12, 2009, AQ Interactive, Inc. announced relocating its headquarters to Shinagawa, Tokyo, between June and August 2009.

On March 26, 2009, AQ Interactive, Inc. announced the establishment of its mobile contents and overseas business divisions, effective on April 1, 2009.

In August 2010, AQ Interactive merged and relocated the Artoon, feelplus, Cavia web sites into a single AQI Development product page.

On March 31, 2011, AQ Interactive, Inc. announced merging its software and amusement business departments into consumer business department.

On June 23, 2011, AQ Interactive, Inc. announced its merger with Marvelous Entertainment and Liveware, effective on October 1, 2011.

Subsidiaries 
XSEED JKS, Inc.: On May 15, 2007, AQ Interactive, Inc. announced the acquisition of XSEED JKS, Inc., with share transfer before June 2007. On May 1, 2009, AQ Interactive, Inc. announced increasing its stake of XSEED JKS, Inc. from 55.0% (486636 shares) to 90.0% (766859 shares) on the day of announcement.
LINKTHINK Inc. (株式会社リンクシンク): On April 16, 2009, AQ Interactive, Inc. announced the acquisition of LINKTHINK Inc., effective on April 16, 2009. AQ Interactive, Inc. would own 66.8% stake (1030 shares) of the subsidiary. On November 6, 2009, AQ Interactive, Inc. announced increasing its stake of LINKTHINK Inc. to 100% (1540 shares).

Former subsidiaries 
Microcabin Corporation (株式会社マイクロキャビン): On 2008-05-09, AQ Interactive, Inc. announced the acquisition of Microcabin Corporation via share purchase, with trade on May 16, 2008. On January 14, 2011, AQ Interactive, Inc. announced selling its 85% stake (312704 shares) of Microcabin Corporation to Fields Corporation (フィールズ株式会社), and Microcabin Corporation became a consolidated subsidiary of Fields Corporation.
feelplus Inc. (株式会社フィールプラス): A carryover subsidiary of cavia inc. On April 28, 2011, AQ Interactive, Inc. announced merging feelplus Inc. into AQ Interactive, Inc., effective on August 1, 2011.
Cavia Inc. (株式会社キャビア): On April 28, 2011, AQ Interactive, Inc. announced merging Cavia Inc. into AQ Interactive, Inc., effective on August 1, 2011.
Artoon (株式会社アートゥーン): On April 28, 2011, AQ Interactive, Inc. announced merging Artoon into AQ Interactive, Inc., effective on August 1, 2011.

Released games 
The following are games developed and/or published by AQ Interactive.
Arcade
Pokémon Battrio (2007) : Fighting
Higurashi no Naku Koro ni Jong (Higurashi When They Cry characters mahjong video game) (2009) : Mahjong
Touch the Numbers (TBA)
Cubemall : UFO catcher
Minna de Derby : Horse racing

PlayStation 2
Love Com (2006) : Adventure
Driver: Parallel Lines (Japanese version) (2006): Action
Arcana Heart (2007) : Fighting
Suggoi! Arcana Heart 2 (2009) : Fighting

PlayStation 3
Vampire Rain: Altered Species (2008) : Action-adventure/Stealth

PlayStation Portable
Jitsuroku Oniyome Nikki (2006) : Action
Anata wo Yurusanai (2007) : Sound novel
Higurashi no Naku Koro ni Jan (2009) : Mahjong
CR Hana no Keiji Zan (Cancelled) : Pachinko simulator

Wii
Victorious Boxers: Revolution (2007) : Fighting
The World of Golden Eggs: Nori Nori Rhythm-kei (2008) : Rhythm action
Ju-on: The Grudge (2009) : Survival horror/Graphic adventure
Club Penguin: Game Day! (2010) : Minigame collection

Nintendo DSBoing! Docomodake DS (2007) : PuzzleKORG DS-10 (2008) : Music synthesizer softwareBlue Dragon Plus (2008) : Tactical role-playingAway: Shuffle Dungeon (2008) : Role-playingKORG DS-10 Plus (2009) : Music synthesizer software

Nintendo 3DSCubic Ninja (2011) : Action puzzle

Xbox 360Tetris: The Grand Master ACE (2005) : PuzzleTsuushin Taisen Mahjong Touryuumon (2006) : MahjongBullet Witch (2006) : Action-adventureVampire Rain (2007) : Action-adventure/Stealth

Browser gameBrowser Sangokushi (2009) : Strategy/SimulationBaka to Test to Shōkanjū for Mixi (2010) : Quiz/SimulationDerby Master (2010) : Horse racing/SimulationBrowser Baseball (2010) : Sports/Simulation

iPhoneGlandarius Wing Strike (2009) : Shoot 'em up

 Developed games 
WiiThe Last Story (2011) – co-developed with Mistwalker / published by Nintendo

Nintendo 3DSAnimal Resort (2011) – published by Marvelous Entertainment

PlayStation 3No More Heroes: Heroes' Paradise'' (2010) – published by Marvelous Entertainment and Konami

References

External links 
   (archived from the original)
AQ Interactive profile at IGN
LINKTHINK Inc. page

Japanese companies established in 2005
Japanese companies disestablished in 2011
Video game companies established in 2005
Video game companies disestablished in 2011
Software companies based in Tokyo
Defunct video game companies of Japan
Video game development companies
Video game publishers